Kleve is a railway station in the town of Kleve, North Rhine Westphalia, Germany. The station opened on 5 March 1863 on the Lower Left Rhine Railway. The train services are operated by NordWestBahn.

History
The station was an important international station on the Nijmegen - Kleve - Kevelaer - Krefeld - Düsseldorf route until 1991. In Kleve the line is no longer intact towards Nijmegen, however there are sections which still exist outside the town. The station also had a connection to Rheinhausen until 1990. Until 1982 there was also a line to Zevenaar.

Train services
The station is served by the following services:

Regional service  Kleve - Kevelaer - Krefeld - Düsseldorf

Bus services

A number of buses serve the station, including to Nijmegen, Emmerich, Xanten and Kranenburg.

References

Railway stations in North Rhine-Westphalia
Railway stations in Germany opened in 1863
Buildings and structures in Kleve (district)